André Marques may refer to:
 André Marques (footballer) (born 1987), Portuguese footballer
 André Marques (pianist) (born 1975), Brazilian jazz pianist
 André Marques (actor) (born 1979), Brazilian actor, television host and entertainer
 André Marques (filmmaker) (born 1984), Portuguese film director, screenwriter and a musician